Oh, Serafina! is a 1976 Italian comedy-drama film directed by Alberto Lattuada.

It is strictly based on the novel with the same name by Giuseppe Berto.  For this film Fred Bongusto was awarded with a Nastro d'Argento for Best Score.

Cast 
Renato Pozzetto: Augusto Valle
Dalila Di Lazzaro: Serafina
Angelica Ippolito: Palmira Radice, moglie di Augusto
Marisa Merlini: mamma di Augusto
Gino Bramieri: Il sindaco
Aldo Giuffrè: Professor Caroniti
Fausto Tozzi: Carlo Vigeva
Enrico Beruschi: Impiegato anagrafe
Lilla Brignone: Segretaria della ditta Valle 
Howard Ross: Romeo Radice
Brizio Montinaro: Rag.Cusetti
Gianni Magni: Tommaso
Ettore Manni: padre di Serafina
Alberto Lattuada: Medico del manicomio 
Daniele Vargas: Assessore Buglio
Maria Monti

See also    
 List of Italian films of 1976

References

External links

1976 films
Commedia all'italiana
Films directed by Alberto Lattuada
Italian comedy-drama films
Films scored by Fred Bongusto
1970s Italian films